Official participation in the Synod of Dort, held in 1618–9 in Dordrecht in the Netherlands, consisted of different groups: Dutch ministers, church elders, and theologians; representatives of churches outside the Dutch Republic; and Dutch lay politicians. There were 14 Remonstrants who were summoned, in effect as defendants. There were also some observers, who had no voting status.
Listings are usually given according to a traditional ordering for the provinces that begins with Gelderland; for the provincial synods Holland was divided into two, North and South. In the sources both Latinised names and spelling variants occur. Lists of those nominated to participate in some capacity differ from those who signed the final Acts of the Synod. Figures vary a little, but one total given is for 102 official participants. The outcome of the Synod was the most significant single event in the Calvinist-Arminian debate.

The Dutch members of the Synod were divided up by provincial synods (for the clerics and elders as delegates), or by provinces (for the lay members). Allowing for Holland as exception, the delegates were divided into ten "colleges": one for each of seven provinces, plus Drenthe; one for theological faculties; and one for the Walloon churches.

Dutch delegates

Dutch theologians

Delegates from Dutch provincial synods

Dutch lay commissioners
 Jacob de Witt (treasurer)

The commissioners by province were:
Gelderland and Zutphen: Martinus Gregorius, Hendrik van Essen.
Holland and West Friesland: Walrave de Brederode, Hugo Muys van Holy, Jacobus Boelens, Gerardus van Nieuburg, Rochus van Honaert, Nicholaas Krombout.
Zealand: Symon Scotte, Jacobus van Kampe.
Utrecht: Frederik van Zuylen, van Nieuveld, Willem Herteveld.
Friesland: Ernestus van Aylva, Ernestus ad Harinksma.
Overijssel: Hendrik van Haagen, Johannes van Hemerde.
Groningen: Hieronimus Ysbrants, Efaart Jacob Clant, Daniel Heinsius.

Of these Gregorius, van Honaert, Krombout, and Ysbrands were doctors of both laws. The list of commissioners later signing the Acts of the Synod is somewhat different.

Remonstrants
A number of prominent Remonstrant ministers were cited to appear before the Synod, around 10% of the 200 identified Remonstrants at that time in the Dutch Reformed Church. Of those, a number were deprived of their church posts before the proceedings, which formed the latter part of the political and religious struggle that had been triggered in 1618, and which came to a head after the Synod closed. Only three Remonstrants were among the delegates (from Utrecht, two ministers and a church elder). Simon Episcopius emerged as leader of the group of Remonstrants who were summoned. His efforts to secure participation in the debates of the Synod for the group failed after extensive procedural discussion; the summoned Remonstrants were, however, required to remain in Dordrecht. With one exception they refused to subscribe to the required declaration at the end of the Synod, were expelled from the Church, and banished. In total around 70 Remonstrant ministers were banished in the aftermath of the Synod.

The 14 Remonstrants banished by the Synod were:

Gelderland: Bernerus Wezekius, Henricus Hollingerus.
South Holland: Simon Episcopius, Iohannes Arnoldi Corvinus, Bernardus Dwinglonius, Eduardus Popius, Theophilus Rickwaerdius.
North Holland: Phillippus Pinakerus, Dominicus Sampa.
Utrecht: Isaacus Frederici, Samuel Neranus.
Overijssel: Thomas Goswinus, Assuerus Mathisius.
Walloon churches: Carolus Niellius.

(These are the Latinised names as given, correcting two spellings.) Apart from the Utrecht representative ministers who were Remonstrants–Frederici and Naeranus–these clergy were therefore not full participants in the Synod at any point.

A baseline list of 13 names in Historie der Remonstranten (1774) by Jacobus Regenboog is of those Remonstrants who were summoned (and omitting the delegates Frederici and Naeranus from the Utrecht provincial synod):

Gelderland: Henricus Leo of Bommel, Vezekius of Egteld, Hollingerus of Grave.
South Holland: Episcopius, Arnoldi and Dwinglo of Leiden, Poppius of Gouda, Rykewaard of Brielle.
North Holland: Pynakker of Alkmaar, Sapma of Hoorn.
Overijssel: Gozuinus and Mathisius of Kampen.
Walloon churches: Niellius of Utrecht.

It was Henricus Leo who was the sole Remonstrant of these summoned who signed the Act of Cessation (acte van stilstand) as required by the Synod, and escaped banishment. His absence from the first list gives numbers that tally.

There is a longer listing in the works of John Hales of those Remonstrants who were cited by the Synod (21 names, but 20 if Joannes Arnoldi and Corvinus are duplicates); this list includes names of ministers who were by other means removed from their posts. The breakdown by provinces is:

Gelderland: Leo, Wezekius, Holderingus.
South Holland: Adrianus Bozzius, Nicolaus Grevinchovius, Episcopius, Arnoldi, Poppius, Rickwardus.
North Holland: Joannes Geysteranus, Sapma.
Overijssel: Goswinius, Mathisius.
Walloon churches: Simon Goulartius, Niellius.
Utrecht: Utenbogardus, Corvinus, Duinghonius, Pinakerus, Neranus, Friderici.

Goulartius (Simon Goulart the Younger of Geneva, 1575–1628) the Remonstrant was the son of Simon Goulart of Senlis (1543–1628). Though summoned he had already been dismissed from his post.

Foreign representatives
There were 27 delegates who attended from outside the Dutch provinces. Two replacements were made during the Synod.

Great Britain

Imperial delegates
There was some consideration given to invitations to clergy from Reformed churches in the German principalities and cities of the Empire, with a view to being selective and distinguishing among types of nominally Calvinist church. Invitations were issued to: the Palatinate, Brandenburg, Hesse-Kassel, Nassau, East Friesland, Hanau. Anhalt was excluded. John Sigismund, Elector of Brandenburg declined to send a delegation; the Calvinist–Lutheran relationship in Brandenburg was fragile, and a diplomatic excuse was made. It was later alleged that Anhalt was not invited, for fear that the delegation would be pro-Remonstrant.

France
From France: None because the French government prohibited their attendance. A set of empty chairs was set up in the assembly in honor of the absent French Huguenots. Four delegates had been chosen by the National Synod: Daniel Chamier, Jean Chauve, Pierre Du Moulin and André Rivet.

Observers

References
Peter Ymen de Jong (1898), Crisis in the Reformed Churches; Essays in commemoration of the great Synod of Dort 1618–1619
Jonathan I. Israel (1998), The Dutch Republic: Its Rise, Greatness and Fall
Anthony Milton (editor) (2005), The British Delegation and the Synod of Dort
Philip Schaff, Creeds of Christendom, with a History and Critical notes. Volume I. The History of Creeds ¶65: The Arminian Controversy; online text.
Theologische Realenzyklopädie, Volume 9 (1982) (editors Horst Robert Balz, Gerhard Krause, Gerhard Müller) at p. 143, for a complete listing of delegates from outside the Netherlands; Google Books.

Notes

External links

 
Synod of Dort
Arminianism